Alana Bremner (born 10 February 1997) is a New Zealand rugby union player. She plays for Matatū in the Super Rugby Aupiki competition and for Canterbury provincially. She also represents New Zealand internationally and was a member of their 2021 Rugby World Cup champion squad.

Career 

Bremner was the first woman to play 50 matches for Lincoln University, and earned 50 caps for Canterbury. She played three matches for the New Zealand Development side at the 2019 Oceania Rugby Women's Championship in Fiji. In 2020, she captained the New Zealand Barbarians in the two-match series against the Black Ferns. Her older sister, Chelsea, made her Black Ferns debut in the first match.

Bremner was named in the Black Ferns squad for the European tour of England and France in 2021. She made her international debut against England on 31 October 2021 at Exeter, it was the Black Ferns 100th test match. She also scored her first Test try in the match. She also played in the second test match against France.

At the end of 2021, Bremner was selected for Matatū for the inaugural 2022 Super Rugby Aupiki season.

Bremner and her sister, Chelsea, were named in the Black Ferns squad for the 2022 Pacific Four Series. She scored a try in the first match against the Wallaroos. She was recalled into the team for the August two-test series against the Wallaroos for the Laurie O'Reilly Cup.

Bremner was selected for the Black Ferns 2021 Rugby World Cup 32-player squad. She scored a try against Wales in the quarterfinals. She was a part of the Black Ferns team that were crowned champions for the sixth time.

Bremner re-signed with Matatū for the 2023 season.

References

External links 

 Black Ferns Profile

1997 births
Living people
New Zealand female rugby union players
New Zealand women's international rugby union players